Davide Boifava (born 14 November 1946) is an Italian former professional road bicycle racer and cycling team manager.

Major results 

1966
 1st Trofeo Alcide Degasperi
1968
 1st Stage 2a Tour de l'Avenir
1969
 1st  Pursuit, National Track Championships
 1st Overall Tour de Luxembourg
 Giro d'Italia
1st Stage 2
Held  after Stage 2
 1st Overall Cronostafetta (TTT)
1st Stage 1 (ITT)
 1st GP Marina di Massa-Pian della Fioba
 2nd GP Montelupo
 3rd Trofeo Baracchi (with Eddy Merckx)
 3rd Grand Prix des Nations
1970
 1st Giro della Romagna
 2nd Overall Tour de Romandie
 3rd Overall Tour de l'Oise
 3rd Milano–Torino
 4th Overall Giro di Sardegna
 5th Trofeo Laigueglia
1971
 1st Stage 12 (ITT) Giro d'Italia
 2nd GP Forli
 10th Overall Tirreno–Adriatico
1972
 1st Trofeo Matteotti
 1st GP Montelupo
 2nd Trofeo Baracchi (with Felice Gimondi)
 3rd Coppa Placci
 4th Giro di Toscana
 6th Tre Valli Varesine
 7th Overall Tirreno–Adriatico
1973
 1st  Pursuit, National Track Championships
 2nd Trofeo Baracchi (with Gösta Pettersson)
 2nd Giro della Provincia di reggio Calabria
 5th Overall Tirreno–Adriatico
 6th Milano–Torino
 9th Coppa Placci
1974
 3rd Giro del Friuli
1975
 3rd Gran Premio Città di Camaiore
 9th Trofeo Matteotti
1976
 3rd Trofeo Baracchi (with Jørgen Marcussen)

Grand Tour general classification results timeline

External links 

Italian male cyclists
Italian track cyclists
1946 births
Living people
Cyclists from the Province of Brescia